Greyfield is an estate with a Colonial Revival-style house of the same name on Cumberland Island in Camden County, Georgia; it was listed on the National Register of Historic Places in 2003. The inn is also a member of Historic Hotels of America, the official program of the National Trust for Historic Preservation.

It has also been known as Greyfield Inn since opening to the public as an inn in 1962. The house was built during 1901 to 1905 for Margaret Carnegie Ricketson and her husband Oliver Ricketson, and was one of several built for Carnegie family members within a large Carnegie family estate on Cumberland. Their daughter Lucy Carnegie Ferguson lived in the house for over seventy years.

On Sept. 21, 1996 it was the location of the wedding between John F Kennedy Jr and Carolyn Bessette.

References

External links
Greyfield Inn website

Houses on the National Register of Historic Places in Georgia (U.S. state)
Colonial Revival architecture in Georgia (U.S. state)
Houses completed in 1905
National Register of Historic Places in Camden County, Georgia
Houses in Camden County, Georgia
Cumberland Island
1905 establishments in Georgia (U.S. state)
Carnegie family residences
Hotels in the Jacksonville metropolitan area
Historic Hotels of America